Black Sheep Productions (or simply Black Sheep) is a Philippine film studio that is a subsidiary of ABS-CBN Film Productions, a division of ABS-CBN Corporation. Founded in 2018, the studio produces films that are situated in between independent films and mainstream films released by the major Philippine film studios.

Black Sheep is best known for producing the films Exes Baggage (2018), Alone/Together (2019), Fan Girl (2020), and Whether the Weather is Fine (2021).

History 
Black Sheep was founded in 2018. The brand positions itself in between ABS-CBN Film Productions's two other major brands, Star Cinema, which is more family-oriented, and Cinema One Originals, which is considered more arthouse.

List of Black Sheep films

2018

2019

2020

2021

Upcoming films

References

External links 

ABS-CBN subsidiaries
Entertainment companies of the Philippines
Film production companies of the Philippines
Mass media companies established in 2018
Philippine film studios
Television production companies of the Philippines
Philippine companies established in 2018